Show Me Yours is a Canadian comedy television series originally aired on Showcase between May 26, 2004 and May 31, 2005.

Plot 

Dr. Kate Langford (Rachael Crawford) is a psychologist whose life is going well: she has a boyfriend David Exley (Jeff Seymour), and a new book deal until she meets Dr. Benjamin Chase (Adam Harrington).

Broadcast information 

The show was aired in Canada on Showcase and in the United States on the Oxygen Network.

Home media
Entertainment One released the entire series on DVD in Region 1 on November 10, 2009.

References

External links 
 Show Me Yours at Epguides.com
 Show Me Yours at Showcase.ca
 Show Me Yours at Yahoo! TV
 

2004 Canadian television series debuts
2005 Canadian television series endings
2000s Canadian sitcoms
Showcase (Canadian TV channel) original programming
Television series by Entertainment One